This is a list of mass shootings in the United States that have occurred in 2021. Mass shootings are incidents involving several victims of firearm-related violence. The precise inclusion criteria are disputed, and there is no broadly accepted definition.

Gun Violence Archive, a nonprofit research group, run by Tracy Holtan, that tracks shootings and their characteristics in the United States, defines a mass shooting as an incident in which four or more people, excluding the perpetrator(s), are shot in one location at roughly the same time. The Congressional Research Service narrows that definition, limiting it to "public mass shootings", defined by four or more victims killed, excluding any victims who survive. The Washington Post and Mother Jones use similar definitions, with the latter acknowledging that their definition "is a conservative measure of the problem", as many shootings with fewer fatalities occur. The crowdsourced Mass Shooting Tracker project has the most expansive definition of four or more shot in any incident, including the perpetrator in the victim inclusion criteria. A 2019 study of mass shootings published in the journal Injury Epidemiology recommended developing "a standard definition that considers both fatalities and nonfatalities to most appropriately convey the burden of mass shootings on gun violence." The authors of the study further suggested that "the definition of mass shooting should be four or more people, excluding the shooter, who are shot in a single event regardless of the motive, setting or number of deaths."

As of December 2021, 693 (of which 303 resulted in zero deaths) fit the Mass Shooting Tracker project criterion, leaving 703 people dead and 2,842 injured, for a total of 3,545 total victims, some including the shooter(s).

Definitions 
 Stanford University MSA Data Project: three or more persons shot in one incident, excluding the perpetrator(s), at one location, at roughly the same time. Excluded are shootings associated with organized crime, gangs or drug wars.
 Mass Shooting Tracker: four or more persons shot in one incident, at one location, at roughly the same time.
 Gun Violence Archive/Vox: four or more shot in one incident, excluding the perpetrators, at one location, at roughly the same time.
 Mother Jones: three or more shot and killed in one incident at a public place, excluding the perpetrators. This list excludes all shootings the organization consider to be "conventionally motivated" such as all gang violence and armed robberies.
 The Washington Post: four or more shot and killed in one incident at a public place, excluding the perpetrators.
 ABC News/FBI: four or more shot and killed in one incident, excluding the perpetrators, at one location, at roughly the same time.
 Congressional Research Service: four or more shot and killed in one incident, excluding the perpetrators, at a public place, excluding gang-related killings and those done with a profit-motive.

Only incidents considered mass shootings by at least two of the above sources are listed below. Consequently, any shooting incident that satisfies the ABC News/FBI or Gun Violence Archive/Vox definitions will always be accepted, as anything that fits their definitions will be accepted under the Mass Shooting Tracker's definition. Similarly, any shooting incident that satisfies the Congressional Research Service definition will always be accepted, as anything that fits its definition will be accepted under the Mother Jones definition.

List 
Parenthetical number indicates the number of mass shootings that occurred in that city year to date.

Monthly statistics 

The statistics columns for each month are updated after the month ends, in an effort to make sure the correct number of events, individuals affected, and descriptions are accurate. Thus, the number may be incomplete throughout the month until the last day of each month.

State statistics 

This table is based on the above list as of December 31, 2021.

See also 
 List of school shootings in the United States (before 2000)
 List of school shootings in the United States (2000–present)
 List of school shootings in the United States by death toll
 Casualty recording
 List of countries by firearm-related death rate
 List of countries by intentional homicide rate
 Percent of households with guns by country
 Estimated number of civilian guns per capita by country

Notes

References

External links 
 Gun Violence Archive Mass Shootings
 Mass Shooting Tracker Mass Shootings
 Mother Jones Mass Shootings
 USA Today Mass Shootings
 Vox Mass Shootings
 Washington Post Mass Shootings
 Active Shooter Incidents in the United States in 2021

 
2021 murders in the United States
Mass shootings in the United States
2021
2021